Madhurai Perumaruthanār (Tamil: மதுரைப் பெருமருதனார்) was a poet of the Sangam period, to whom a single verse of the Sangam literature has been attributed, besides verse 37 of the Tiruvalluva Maalai.

Biography
Madurai Perumarudhanar hailed from the city of Madurai. He is the father of the Sangam poet Madurai Perumarudhu Ilanaganar.

Contribution to the Sangam literature
Madurai Perumarudhanar has written a sole Sangam verse—verse 241 of the Natrinai. Apart from this, he has also composed verse 37 in the Tiruvalluva Maalai.

See also

 Sangam literature
 List of Sangam poets
 Tiruvalluva Maalai

Notes

Tamil philosophy
Tamil poets
Sangam poets
Tiruvalluva Maalai contributors